These are the official results of the Men's Team Road Race at the 1952 Summer Olympics in Helsinki, Finland, held on August 2, 1952 as a part of the Men's Individual Road Race. The best three performances by nation were rewarded, with twenty-seven teams competing.

Final classification

Non-finishers

Did not finish with three riders

Donald Sheldon
Thomas O'Rourke 
David Rhoads (—)
Ronald Rhoads (—)

Peter Pryor
Jim Nevin
Ken Caves (—) 
Peter Nelson (—)

Yevgeny Klevtsov
Anatoly Kolesov (—) 
Nikolay Babarenko (—) 
Vladimir Kryushkov (—)

Raino Koskenkorva
Paul Backman (—) 
Paul Nyman (—) 
Ruben Forsblom (—)

Angel Romero
Francisco Lozano (—) 
Julio Cepeda (—) 
Ricardo García (—) 

Petar Georgiev
Boyan Kotsev (—) 
Ilya Velchev (—) 
Milcho Rosev (—)

Quan Luu
Chau Phuoc Vinh (—) 
Nguyen Duc Hien (—) 
Van Phuoc Le (—)

Walter Bortel (—) 
Franz Wimmer (—) 
Arthur Mannsbarth (—)

Hernán Masanés (—) 
Héctor Droguett (—) 
Héctor Mellado (—) 
Hugo Miranda (—)

István Lang (—) 
István Schillerwein (—) 
Lajos Látó (—) 

Raj Kumar Mehra (—) 
Netai Bysack (—) 
Prodip Bose (—) 
Suprovat Chakravarty (—)

Kihei Tomioka (—) 
Masazumi Tajima (—) 
Tadashi Kato (—) 
Tamotsu Chikanari (—)

Kwon Ik-Hyun (—) 
Im Jang-Jo (—) 
Kim Ho-Soon (—)

George Estman (—) 
Alfred Swift (—) 
Robert Fowler (—)

Jan Veselý (—) 
Karel Nesl (—) 
Milan Perič (—)  
Stanislav Svoboda (—)

Did not start with three riders

Alois Lampert
Ewald Hasler 

Muhammad Naqi Mallick (—)
Imtiaz Bhatti (—)

See also
Men's Individual Road Race

References

External links
 Official Report

Road cycling at the 1952 Summer Olympics
Cycling at the Summer Olympics – Men's team road race